Mehdiabad-e Bozorg (also Romanized as Mehdīābād-e Bozorg; also known as Mehdīābād, Ḩājjīābād, Mekhtyabad, and Mihdiābād) is a village in Eqbal-e Gharbi Rural District, in the Central District of Qazvin County, Qazvin Province, Iran. At the 2006 census, its population was 1,359, in 317 families.

References 

Populated places in Qazvin County